Guido Andreozzi and Marcel Felder were the defending champions, but they chose not to compete.

Fabiano de Paula and Marcelo Demoliner defeated Ricardo Hocevar and Leonardo Kirche 6–3, 6–4 in the final to win the title.

Seeds

Draw

Draw

References
 Main Draw

Rio Quente Resorts Tennis Classicandnbsp;- Singlesandnbsp;- Doubles
2013 Doubles
Rio